The Los Angeles Philharmonic Institute was a summer training program held in Los Angeles, California for conservatory aged orchestral instrumentalists and conductors.  It ran from 1982 to 1991 under the auspices of the Los Angeles Philharmonic.

History 
The Los Angeles Philharmonic Institute was founded by Ernest Fleischmann and Leonard Bernstein, with Bernstein and Daniel Lewis serving as artistic directors.  Subsequent artistic directors have included Michael Tilson Thomas, Sir Charles Groves, André Previn, Lukas Foss, and finally Lynn Harrell (1988–1992).

Most of the faculty were musicians from the Los Angeles Philharmonic, but also included many other prominent musicians, including Vladimir Spivakov, Nadja Salerno-Sonnenberg, Erich Leinsdorf, Edo de Waart, Leonard Slatkin, and Jesús López-Cobos, among others.

The Institute was notable for the amount of daily, hands-on instruction students received from faculty, even when compared to other similar summer programs, such as Tanglewood.  Lynn Harrell said, "Not only do the students have an almost daily open working situation with Philharmonic players, but they'll have the opportunity to join them in performance [at the Hollywood Bowl]....  To sit next to experienced orchestra musicians and play with that kind of immediacy is worth a thousand words. There's a give-and-take here on many levels."

In December 1991, Fleischmann announced that the 1992 Institute would be cancelled due to budget cuts by the Philharmonic.

Notable alumni

Conducting Fellows 
 Gisele Ben-Dor
 Thomas Dausgaard
 Paavo Järvi
 Yakov Kreizberg
 Jahja Ling
 Keith Lockhart
 David Alan Miller
 Keith Lockhart
 Eiji Oue
 Stefan Sanderling
 Toshiyuki Shimada
 Michael Stern
 Mario Venzago
 Leif Bjaland
 William Eddins

Strings 

 Carolyn Waters Broe
 Tatjana Mead Chamis (Associate Principal Viola, Pittsburgh Symphony)
 Ben Hong (Associate Principal Cello, Los Angeles Philharmonic)
 Ingrid Hutman (Viola, Los Angeles Philharmonic)
 Eric Lee (Associate Concertmaster, Kennedy Center Opera House Orchestra)
Charles Bingham, Solista Bilbao Symphony Orchestra since 1995- current.
 Josefina Vergara (Principal Second Violin, Los Angeles Chamber Orchestra)
 Glen Wanner (Assistant Principal Bass, Nashville Symphony)

Woodwinds 
 Sue Heineman (Principal Bassoon, National Symphony)
 Marni Hougham, (English horn, Minnesota Orchestra)
 Susan McGinn (Principal Flute, Honolulu Symphony)
 Theodore Soluri, (Principal Bassoon, Dallas Symphony)
 Philip Dikeman, (Former Acting Principal Flute, Detroit Symphony, Associate Professor Vanderbilt University)
 Michael Lisicky, (Oboe, Baltimore Symphony)
 Nancy Ambrose King, (Professor of Oboe, University of Michigan)
 Lee Livengood, (Bass clarinet, Utah Symphony)

Brass 
 Elizabeth Cook-Shen (former Horn, Los Angeles Philharmonic)
 Dai Zhonghui (Principal Trumpet, National Symphony Orchestra of China)
 Matthew Guilford (Bass Trombone, National Symphony)
 Brian Rood (Trumpet, Kansas City Symphony)
 David Washburn (Principal Trumpet, Los Angeles Chamber Orchestra)

References 

Classical music festivals in the United States
California culture